The Turkmen Ground Forces is the army branch of the Armed Forces of Turkmenistan.  The ground forces include the 2nd, 3rd, 11th, and 22nd Motor Rifle Divisions as well as smaller units consisting of various types of troops.

History 
The basis of the present-day Turkmen Ground Forces are several rifle divisions from the Turkestan Military District (based in neighboring Uzbekistan) of the Soviet Armed Forces. Of these units, the 36th Army Corps was stationed in the Turkmen SSR. More than 50,000 former Soviet Army personnel were either withdrawn or fired following the creation of the national defence ministry. This was more than half the Soviet troops who operated in the Turkmen SSR at the end of 1991. The interim army commanders in the first half of the 1990s included Major General Viktor Zavarzin and Lieutenant General Nikolai Kormiltsev (chief of staff and commander of the Separate Combined-Arms Army of Turkmenistan respectively). By 1993, the ground forces operated 200 military units, 70 of which were under joint Turkmen-Russian jurisdictions. The ground forces had been reduced to about 11,000 by 1996, which was organized into a singular army corps. The army has celebrated 27 January as Defender of the Fatherland Day since 2009.

Structure 

Units of the Ground Forces are located in each of the five military districts: Ahal Military District, Balkan Military District, Dashoguz Military District, Lebap Military District, Mary Military District. Direct operational control of the ground forces is carried out by the General Staff of the Armed Forces of Turkmenistan.

In late 2017, the International Institute for Strategic Studies listed the Ground Forces with a special forces regiment; a tank brigade, reportedly the 14th; the 3rd Motor Rifle Division, of a tank regiment, three motor rifle regiments, and an artillery regiment; the 22nd Motor Rifle Division "Atamyrat Niyazov" with one tank regiment, one motor rifle regiment, and an artillery regiment; four motor rifle brigades; a naval infantry brigade, and the 2nd Training Motor Rifle Division "Alp Arslan". The IISS also listed smaller formations: a Scud brigade with SS-1 Scud; an artillery brigade; a mixed artillery/anti-tank regiment; a multiple rocket launcher brigade; an anti-tank regiment; an engineer regiment; and two surface-to-air missile brigades.

An undated list of Ground Forces units included the following:

2nd Training Motor Rifle Division "Alp Arslan" (Headquarters Tejen in the Ahal Region)
1 Tank Regiment
1 Motorized Rifle Regiment
1 Artillery Regiment
3rd Motorized Rifle Division named Bairam Khan (Headquarters Ashgabat)
1 Tank Regiment
3 Motorized Rifle Regiments
1 Artillery Regiment
11th Motor Rifle Division "Sultan Sanjar" (Headquarters Serhetabat, Mary Region)
1 Tank Regiment
1 (23rd) Motorized Rifle Regiment
1 Artillery Regiment
22nd Motorized Rifle Division named after Hero of Turkmenistan Atamyrat Niyazov (Headquarters Serdar, Balkan Region)
1 Tank Regiment
1 Motorized Rifle Regiment
1 Artillery Regiment
4th Separate Motorized Rifle Brigade named after Tughril (deployed in the city of Kerki, Lebap Region)
5th Separate Motorized Rifle Brigade named after Chaghri Beg
6th Separate Motorized Rifle Brigade named after Gorogly Beg
152nd Independent Air Assault Battalion
Artillery Brigade (deployed near Ashgabat)
Independent Anti-Tank Regiment
Independent Mixed Artillery Anti-Tank Regiment
Rocket-propelled Artillery Team (deployed near Ashgabat)
Anti-aircraft Missile Brigade named after Saparmurat Niyazov
Anti-aircraft Missile Brigade
Independent Engineer Regiment (deployed near Ashgabat)
Independent Honor Guard Battalion of the Ministry of Defence (deployed in Ashgabat)

Facilities 
Kelyata Training Center (Bäherden District of the Ahal Region)
Northern Kelete Training Ground (near the village of Kelete)
Mountain Training Center "South Kelyata" (near Ashgabat)

Equipment

Commanders 

 Geldymukhammed Ashirmukhammedov (1997-2002)
 Colonel Mashat Orazgeldyev (2002-24 June 2004)
 Colonel Bayramgeldy Akummedov (23 June 2007 – 5 November 2009)
 Lieutenant Colonel Batyr Mollayev (5 November 2009-?)
Colonel Rovshen Ayazov (c. 2017)

Traditions

Battle Banners 
To receive a battle banner, commanders of military units approach the Supreme Commander-in-Chief, receiving the battle banner from his hands and handing it over to the standard bearer. Then, having unfurled the green battle banners, groups of standard-bearers led by their commanders, chasing a step, pass in front of the line of participants in the current ceremony and take their places. It occurs on holidays such as State Flag and Constitution Day.

Cavalry 

In October 2012, special cavalry units were ordered to be established in the ground forces. That same year, the Equestrian Complex of the Ministry of Defense was opened.

Ranks 
In 2003, President Niyazov called for the strengthening of the Ground Forces in accordance with national traditions. Speaking at the Defence Ministry, he said that the Turkmen "esger" (warrior) carries more respect that just “soldier”. As a result, he reverted the ranks to traditional names and structure:

 Esger - warrior
 Onbashi - leader of 10 (section leader)
 Yuzbashi - leader of 100 (junior officer)
 Munbashi - leader of 1000 (senior officer)
 Goshunbashi - Army commander

The rank of a marshal was also reintroduced. These ranks were all reverted to their more russified predecessors after his death in 2006.

Personnel

Conscripts 
Service in the army is required for all males under 27 years of age. Only some of the conscript's time in the military is occupied with military service, the rest being occupied with "labour" (half a day) and "self-improvement" (2–3 hours a day) by reciting traditional Turkoman texts, learning songs and playing music. Minister of Defence Dangatar Kopekov stated in 1992 that legislation was drafted to where draft dodgers would face "very severe measures, including criminal responsibility". Despite this, desertion is rampant, and was at a 20% rate in 1994. In August 2020, a Turkmen court sentenced Jehovah's Witness siblings to two years in prison for conscientious objection to military service.

See also 
Armed Forces of Turkmenistan
Turkmen Naval Forces
Turkmen Air Force
Begench Beknazarov

References 

Military of Turkmenistan
1992 establishments in Turkmenistan
Armies by country